Brandon Clarke (born September 19, 1996) is a Canadian-American professional basketball player for the Memphis Grizzlies of the National Basketball Association (NBA). He played college basketball for the Gonzaga Bulldogs and San José State University Spartans men’s basketball team. He was drafted 21st overall by the Oklahoma City Thunder in the 2019 NBA draft and then immediately traded to the Grizzlies. He was named to the NBA All-Rookie First Team in 2020.

Early life and high school career
Clarke was born in Vancouver, British Columbia to a Canadian mother and Jamaican father. At age three, Clarke moved with his family to the U.S. city of Phoenix, Arizona; he is now a dual citizen of Canada and the U.S. He attended Desert Vista High School in Phoenix. He was named All-Arizona Division 1 honoree by the Arizona Republic after leading Desert Vista to the championship game in 2015.

College career
He played two seasons for the San Jose State Spartans. As a freshman he was named Mountain West Sixth Man of the Year by the league's head coaches after putting up 10.1 points and 7.3 rebounds in conference play.

As a sophomore, he averaged 17.3 points, 8.7 rebounds, 2.6 blocks, and 2.3 assists on route to being named All-Mountain West First Team and Mountain West All-Defensive Team. After the season he decided to transfer to Gonzaga, where he redshirted the 2017-18 season.

In his junior season at Gonzaga, Clarke continued onward with his improvements to be named the West Coast Conference's Newcomer of the Year, Defensive Player of the Year, and be named a member of the All-WCC First Team. Clarke was the first player in WCC history to win both their Newcomer of the Year and Defensive Player of the Year honors in the same season. He was also named to the All-American Third Team by the Sporting News. On March 23, 2019, Clarke recorded a career-high 36 points alongside 8 rebounds, 5 blocks, and 3 assists in a 83–71 win over #9 seeded Baylor. He became the third player in NCAA Tournament history to record a game of 35+ points alongside 5 blocks, joining Shaquille O'Neal and David Robinson as the only players to do so. Clarke also broke a team record in points scored in an NCAA Tournament game, breaking a record previously set by Adam Morrison.

Professional career

Memphis Grizzlies (2019–present)
Clarke was selected in the first round of the 2019 NBA draft with the 21st overall pick. On July 7, 2019, the Memphis Grizzlies announced that they had officially acquired the right to Clarke from the Oklahoma City Thunder for draft right to Darius Bazley and a future second round draft pick. With four double-doubles, he was named the most valuable player (MVP) of the 2019 NBA Summer League, becoming the second non-American to win the award. He had 15 points, 16 rebounds, 4 assists, and 3 blocks in the championship game to lead Memphis to the league championship, and earned game MVP honors as well, becoming the first non-American to win championship MVP and the first player in Summer League history to win both honors.

On October 23, 2019, Clarke made his NBA debut, coming off the bench in a 101–120 loss to the Miami Heat with eight points, seven rebounds, an assist and a block. On December 18, he scored a career-high 27 points, alongside seven rebounds, in a 122–126 loss to the Oklahoma City Thunder. Clarke again scored 27 points, alongside six rebounds and two steals, in a 111–104 win over the Portland Trail Blazers. On February 25, 2020, it was announced that Clarke would be sidelined because of a right quadricep injury. On September 15, 2020, Clarke was named to the 2019–20 NBA All-Rookie First Team

On December 16, 2020, the Grizzlies exercised their team option on Clarke for the 2021–22 season. On January 8, 2021, he scored a season-high 21 points, alongside eight rebounds, five assists and two blocks, in a 115–110 win over the Brooklyn Nets. The Grizzlies qualified for the postseason for the first time since 2017 after a series of play-in tournament wins. On May 29, during the Grizzlies' first round series against the Utah Jazz, Clarke made his playoff debut, playing seven minutes and grabbing one rebound in a 111–121 Game 3 loss. The Grizzlies were eliminated by the Jazz in five games.

On October 16, 2021, the Grizzlies exercised their team option on Clarke for the 2022–23 season. On January 28, 2022, Clarke scored a season-high 22 points, alongside three rebounds, in a 119–109 win over the Utah Jazz. The Grizzlies qualified for the playoffs for the second straight season, where they faced the Minnesota Timberwolves during their first round series. On April 26, Clarke recorded playoff career-highs of 21 points and 15 rebounds in a 111–109 Game 5 win. On April 29, he recorded 17 points, eleven rebounds, five assists and three blocks as the Grizzlies eliminated the Timberwolves from the playoffs with a 114–106 Game 6 win. The Grizzlies were eventually eliminated during the second round, with the Golden State Warriors beating them in six games.

On October 16, 2022, Clarke signed a four-year, $52 million contract extension with the Grizzlies. On March 3, 2023, during a 113–97 loss to the Denver Nuggets, he suffered a left leg injury and exited the game after playing only two minutes. The next day, the Grizzlies announced that Clarke had suffered a torn left Achilles, ending his 2022–23 season.

Career statistics

NBA

Regular season

|-
| style="text-align:left;"| 
| style="text-align:left;"| Memphis
| 58 || 4 || 22.4 || .618 || .359 || .759 || 5.9 || 1.4 || .6 || .8 || 12.1
|-
| style="text-align:left;"| 
| style="text-align:left;"| Memphis
| 59 || 16 || 24.0 || .517 || .260 || .690 || 5.6 || 1.6 || 1.0 || .9 || 10.3
|-
| style="text-align:left;"| 
| style="text-align:left;"| Memphis
| 64 || 1 || 19.5 || .644 || .227 || .654 || 5.3 || 1.3 || .6 || 1.1 || 10.4
|-
| style="text-align:left;"| 
| style="text-align:left;"| Memphis
| 56 || 8 || 19.5 || .656 || .167 || .723 || 5.5 || 1.3 || .6 || .7 || 10.0
|- class="sortbottom"
| style="text-align:center;" colspan="2"| Career
| 237 || 29 || 21.3 || .604 || .290 || .705 || 5.6 || 1.4 || .7 || .9 || 10.7

Playoffs

|-
| style="text-align:left;"|2021
| style="text-align:left;"|Memphis
| 2 || 0 || 4.5 || .500 || — || — || .5 || .0 || .0 || .5 || 1.0
|-
| style="text-align:left;"|2022
| style="text-align:left;"|Memphis
| 12 || 0 || 24.7 || .615 || .000 || .667 || 7.0 || 2.0 || .8 || .8 || 12.3
|- class="sortbottom"
| style="text-align:center;" colspan="2"| Career
| 14 || 0 || 21.8 || .613 || .000 || .667 || 6.1 || 1.7 || .6 || .8 || 10.7

College

|-
| style="text-align:left;"| 2015–16
| style="text-align:left;"| San Jose State
| 31 || 3 || 23.5 || .634 || .167 || .561 || 5.6 || 1.5 || .7 || 1.2 || 8.8
|-
| style="text-align:left;"| 2016–17
| style="text-align:left;"| San Jose State
| 30 || 30 || 31.9 || .592 || .333 || .572 || 8.7 || 2.3 || 1.2 || 2.6 || 17.3
|-
| style="text-align:left;"| 2017–18
| style="text-align:left;"| Gonzaga
| style="text-align:center;" colspan="11"|  Redshirt
|-
| style="text-align:left;"| 2018–19
| style="text-align:left;"| Gonzaga
| 37 || 36 || 28.1 || style="background:#cfecec;"| .687* || .267 || .694 || 8.6 || 1.9 || 1.2 || 3.1 || 16.9
|- class="sortbottom"
| style="text-align:center;" colspan="2"| Career
| 98 || 69 || 27.8 || .639 || .250 || .618 || 7.7 || 1.9 || 1.0 || 2.3 || 14.5

References

External links
Gonzaga Bulldogs bio
San Jose State Spartans bio

1996 births
Living people
Basketball people from British Columbia
Basketball players from Phoenix, Arizona
Black Canadian basketball players
Canadian expatriate basketball people in the United States
Canadian men's basketball players
Canadian people of Jamaican descent
Gonzaga Bulldogs men's basketball players
Memphis Grizzlies players
Oklahoma City Thunder draft picks
Power forwards (basketball)
San Jose State Spartans men's basketball players
Basketball players from Vancouver
National Basketball Association players from Canada
Canadian emigrants to the United States
American people of Jamaican descent